The University of Lyon, located in Lyon and Saint-Étienne, France, is a center for higher education and research comprising 11 members and 24 associated institutions. The three main universities in this center are: Claude Bernard University Lyon 1, which focuses upon health and science studies and has approximately 27,000 students; Lumière University Lyon 2, which focuses upon the social sciences and arts, and has about 30,000 students; Jean Moulin University Lyon 3, which focuses upon the law and humanities with about 20,000 students.

Members 

Claude Bernard University Lyon 1
Lumière University Lyon 2
Jean Moulin University Lyon 3
Jean Monnet University
École Normale Supérieure de Lyon
École centrale de Lyon
École nationale des travaux publics de l'État (ENTPE)
INSA Lyon
Institut d'études politiques de Lyon
 VetAgro Sup (previously École Nationale Vétérinaire de Lyon)
École nationale d'ingénieurs de Saint-Étienne, (ENISE)
Centre national de la recherche scientifique (CNRS)

Associated institutions  

Emlyon Business School
Université catholique de Lyon
École Nationale Supérieure d'Architecture de Lyon
École Nationale Supérieure d'Architecture de Saint-Etienne
École Nationale Supérieure des Mines de Saint-Étienne
 École supérieure de commerce et management (ESDES)
 Institut polytechnique de Lyon (CPE Lyon, ECAM Lyon, ISARA Lyon, ITECH Lyon)
École nationale des travaux publics de l'État
Ecole Nationale Superieure des Sciences de l'information et des Bibliotheques (enssib)

See also 
 CROUS

References

External links 
 University of Lyon

 
Universities and colleges in Lyon
Educational institutions established in 2007
2007 establishments in France
Universities and colleges formed by merger in France